Salado United Methodist Church is a historic church at Thomas Arnold Road and Church Street in Salado, Texas.

It was built in 1890 and added to the National Register of Historic Places in 1984.

See also

National Register of Historic Places listings in Bell County, Texas
Recorded Texas Historic Landmarks in Bell County

References

United Methodist churches in Texas
Churches on the National Register of Historic Places in Texas
Carpenter Gothic church buildings in Texas
1890s architecture in the United States
Churches in Bell County, Texas
National Register of Historic Places in Bell County, Texas
1890 establishments in Texas
Churches completed in 1890